Barleriola is a genus of flowering plants belonging to the family Acanthaceae.

Its native range is Northern Caribbean.

Species:

Barleriola inermis 
Barleriola multiflora 
Barleriola saturejoides 
Barleriola solanifolia

References

Acanthaceae
Acanthaceae genera